New Road (Nepali: नयाँ सडक) is the busiest street of Pokhara city, Nepal. It refers to a four lane street from Chipledhunga to Sabhagriha Chowk, which is 1.5 km long. It is one of the fastest growing place in Pokhara.

Along with new road there are government offices, banks, clothing stores, supermarkets, schools, hardware stores, video and photo studios, beauty parlors and other businesses.

Boundaries of New Road  

 East: Naya Bazar
 West: Aalu maila 
 North: Chipledhunga
 South: Sabhagriha Chowk

References 

Geography of Pokhara
Streets in Nepal
Transport in Pokhara